Liu Xiangkun is a paralympic athlete from China competing mainly in category T11 sprint events.

At the 2008 Summer Paralympics Liu competed individually in the T11 100m and 200m but it was in the 4 × 100 m where Liu and his teammates won the gold medal in the T11-13 class.

References

Paralympic athletes of China
Athletes (track and field) at the 2008 Summer Paralympics
Paralympic gold medalists for China
Living people
Chinese male sprinters
Year of birth missing (living people)
Medalists at the 2008 Summer Paralympics
Paralympic medalists in athletics (track and field)